Cats and Dogs: The Very Best of Mari Hamada is a compilation album by Japanese singer/songwriter Mari Hamada, released on October 7, 1998 by Universal Victor. The album coincided with Hamada's label transfer from MCA Victor to Polydor Records, as well as the 15th anniversary of her music career. Hamada herself was not involved in the album's track selection.

Cats and Dogs peaked at No. 24 on Oricon's albums chart.

Track listing

Charts

References

External links 
 
 

1998 compilation albums
Japanese-language compilation albums
Mari Hamada compilation albums
Universal Music Japan albums